The Journal of Nuclear Materials is a monthly peer-reviewed scientific journal on materials research for accelerator physics, nuclear power generation and fuel cycle applications. It was established in 1959 and is published by Elsevier. The current editor-in-chief is Gary S. Was (University of Michigan).

Abstracting and indexing
The journal is abstracted and indexed in:
 Chemical Abstracts Service
 Index Medicus/MEDLINE/PubMed
 Science Citation Index
 Current Contents/Physical, Chemical & Earth Sciences
 Current Contents/Engineering, Computing & Technology
 Scopus
According to the Journal Citation Reports, the journal has a 2020 impact factor of 2.936.

References

External links 
 

Elsevier academic journals
English-language journals
Monthly journals
Publications established in 1959
Physics journals
Materials science journals